The Sagasolar Power Station is a solar photovoltaic power station built next to the Hambantota Solar Power Station, in Hambantota, Sri Lanka. The solar farm is owned and developed by Sagasolar, a joint venture between LOLC Group and Faber Capital Limited, with 70% debt funded by DFCC Bank, Commercial Bank of Ceylon, and Hatton National Bank. The 10-megawatt facility is expected to generate approximately 19GWh annually for at least 25 years.

48,000 solar panels manufactured by Solon International are utilized in the solar farm, which extends , within a zone declared for solar power developments by the Sri Lanka Sustainable Energy Authority.

See also 
 List of power stations in Sri Lanka

References 

Solar power stations in Sri Lanka
Buildings and structures in Hambantota District